The 2001 Men's Ice Hockey World Championships were the 65th such event organized by the International Ice Hockey Federation. 40 teams representing their countries participated in several levels of competition. The competition also served as qualifications for division placements in the 2002 competition.

Championship

Final standings
 
 
 
 
 
 
 
 
 
 
 
 
 
  — relegated to Division I for 2002
  — relegated to Division I for 2002

Division I

Group A 

Group A was played in Grenoble, France between April 16 and April 22, 2001

Group B 

Group B was played in Ljubljana, Slovenia between April 15 and April 21, 2001.  The final day was a controversial one, with the British and Slovene teams having to decide promotion based on overall goal differential.  The British beat the Kazakhs by an improbable nine goals.  When coach Chris McSorley was asked how much he paid the Kazakhs, he responded, "zero, you have not much confidence in your team, I think Slovenia can beat Estonia by at least 12 goals."  The medal presentation was marred by Slovenian fans throwing debris on the ice when the Brits received their silver medals, the Kazakh team did not even attend to receive their bronze.

Division II

Group A 

Group A was played in Majadahonda, Spain between April 1 and April 7, 2001

Group B 

Group B was played in Bucharest, Romania between March 26 and April 1, 2001

Citations

External links 

 IIHF Website
 Complete results at Passionhockey.com
 

IIHF Men's World Ice Hockey Championships
World Ice Hockey Championships – Men's